Evanthia is a given name. Notable people with the name include:

Evanthia Kairi (1799–1866), Greek playwright, poet, and feminist
Evanthia Makrygianni (born 1986), Greek synchronized swimmer
Evanthia Maltsi (born 1978), Greek basketball player

Feminine given names